The Satéré marmoset (Mico saterei) is a marmoset species endemic to Brazil.

References

Satéré marmoset
Mammals of Brazil
Endemic fauna of Brazil
Satéré marmoset